There are several World Halls of Fame in different sports or other activities.

World Golf Hall of Fame
World Figure Skating Hall of Fame